Jaimangalpur is a village in West Champaran district in the Indian state of Bihar.

Demographics
As of 2011 India census, Jaimangalpur had a population of 1927 in 352 households. Males constitute 52.1% of the population and females 47.8%. Jaimangalpur has an average literacy rate of 47.48%, lower than the national average of 74%: male literacy is 62.18%, and female literacy is 37.81%. In Jaimangalpur, 23.97% of the population is under 6 years of age.

References

Villages in West Champaran district